The Road Home is a 1999 Chinese romantic drama film directed by Zhang Yimou. It also marked the cinematic debut of the Chinese actress Zhang Ziyi. The Road Home was written by author Bao Shi, who adapted the screenplay from his novel, Remembrance.

The film was shot immediately after Zhang Yimou's previous film, Not One Less, and was released to strong reviews in China in fall 1999.

Plot
The Road Home is the story of a country girl and a young teacher falling in love, and the teacher's death many years later that brings their son back from the big city for the funeral.

The film begins in black and white in present-day China when the son (Sun Honglei) returns to his village from the city upon hearing of his father's death. His mother, Zhao Di (Zhao Yulian), insists upon following the tradition of carrying the coffin back to their remote village by foot so that her husband's spirit will remember its way home. As the narrator, the son recounts the story of his parents' courtship, so famous that it has gained the status of a legend in the village. It is here the bleak black and white turns into vivid colors as the story shifts to the past.

His father, Luo Changyu (Zheng Hao), came to the village as the teacher. Immediately, Zhao Di (Zhang Ziyi) became infatuated with him and he with her. Thus began a courtship which consisted mostly of the exchange of looks and glances between the two. Unfortunately, the courtship was interrupted when Luo was summoned by the government to return to the city. (Several reviewers have speculated that the flashback portion of the film is set during the Anti-Rightist Campaign and that Luo's recall was for investigation and questioning.) Zhao Di's heart was broken; she insisted on waiting for him in the snow and fell so ill that the villagers thought she would die. However, upon hearing news of her illness, the teacher was able to sneak back to the village and Zhao Di, in tears, welcomed the sight of her beloved. Still, their love would not be consummated for a few years more because the teacher was kept away from the village as punishment for having left his assignment in the city without permission.

Returning to the present day, and black and white, the son realizes how important this ritual of carrying the coffin back to village is to his mother, Zhao Di, and he agrees to make all necessary arrangements to fulfill her wish. He is told by the mayor of the village that it might be difficult to find enough porters to carry the father home, as there are few young able men left in the village. The mayor and the son reach an agreement on the price to be paid to the porters. But when the procession sets out, more than 100 people show up to help carry home the casket of the man who was their teacher through various generations in the village. The mayor returns the money to the son, as no one will accept payment for doing what they consider to be an honor rather than a task.

On the morning of the day the son leaves to return to his job in the city, he fulfills his father's dream and teaches a class in the old schoolhouse that was central to his parents having fallen in love, using the textbook his father had written himself.

Cast
 Zhang Ziyi as the young Zhao Di, the protagonist in the middle segment of the film.
 Zhao Yulian as the old Zhao Di, in the beginning and ending segments.
 Zheng Hao as Luo Changyu, a young teacher sent from the city, Zhao Di's husband and the narrator's father.
 Sun Honglei as Luo Yusheng, Zhao Di and Luo Changyu's grown son and the film's narrator, who returns to his home village to bury his father.
 Li Bin as Grandmother, Zhao Di's elderly mother and the narrator's grandmother.

Reception
The Road Home received positive reviews. It won two awards at the 2000 Berlin International Film Festival: the Jury Grand Prix (second best film) and Prize of the Ecumenical Jury. On the review aggregator website Rotten Tomatoes, the film achieved an approval rating of 89% based on 80 reviews, with an average rating of 7.4/10. The site's critical consensus reads, "Beautifully filmed, The Road Home is a simple touching and tender love story." On Metacritic, the film has a weighted average score of 71 out of 100 based on 25 critic reviews, indicating "generally favorable reviews". Praises especially went to the film's visual style and actress Zhang Ziyi's performance, which was her cinematic debut.

Awards

2000 Golden Rooster Awards
 Best Picture
 Best Art Direction — Cao Juiping
 Best Director — Zhang Yimou

2000 Hundred Flowers Awards
 Best Film
 Best Actress — Zhang Ziyi

2000 Berlin International Film Festival
 Silver Bear — Jury Grand Prix
 Prize of the Ecumenical Jury
 Golden Bear (nominated)

2000 Ljubljana International Film Festival
 Audience Award

2001 Bodil Awards
 Best Non-American Film (nominated)

2001 Sundance Film Festival
 Audience World Cinema Award

2001 Chicago Film Critics Association Awards
 Best Foreign Language Film (nominated)

2001 Fajr Film Festival
 Crystal Simorgh for Best Film, International Competition

2001 Florida Film Festival
 Audience Award for Best International Feature Film

See also
 Cinema of China
 Anti-Rightist Movement — Political background of the film

References

External links
  (US)
 
 
 
 
 

1999 films
1999 romantic drama films
Chinese romantic drama films
2000s Mandarin-language films
Films directed by Zhang Yimou
Films based on Chinese novels
Golden Rooster Best Film recipients
Sundance Film Festival award winners
Sony Pictures Classics films
Silver Bear Grand Jury Prize winners